Francisco Mujica (January 29, 1899after 1929) was a Mexican architect. He developed a "neo-American" style of architecture.

Biography 
Mujica was born on January 29, 1899, in Mexico. His father, Mujica y Savago, was a diplomat. He was educated in Mexico, Chile, Spain, Belgium, and Paris, studying architecture, archaeology, urbanism, and sociology. Mujica was a professor at the National Autonomous University of Mexico and in Buenos Aires. He received a silver medal from the Paris Salon.

He investigated ruins in Mexico that dated to the pre-Columbian era and worked to create reconstructions showing what they likely looked like. Based upon these models, Mujica developed a "neo-American" style of architecture which received various awards from the Pan-American Congress of Architects. In 1919 Mujica proposed a skyscraper that would be thirty-four stories and based upon the Pyramid of Huatusco. In 1929 Mujica included his ideas in his introduction to History of the Skyscraper, which he self-published. The book was re-published in 1977 by Da Capo Press.

He also designed a "city of the future" with eighty story buildings and proposed it to the New York City Planning Commission. A commenter for The Brooklyn Daily Eagle described his proposals as "A little more practical than mere oil paint fantasies" and concluded that it was an "interesting idea, but apalling."

His work has been cited as an influence on the Art Deco movement.

References

Bibliography

Further reading 

 

1899 births
20th-century Mexican architects
Year of death missing